The Tankersley Rosenwald School, also known as the Tankersley Elementary School, is a historic American Craftsman-style school building in Hope Hull, Alabama, a suburb of Montgomery.  This Rosenwald School building was built in 1922 to serve the local African American community.  The money to build the school was provided, in part, by the Julius Rosenwald Fund.  It was added to the Alabama Register of Landmarks and Heritage on June 26, 2003, and to the National Register of Historic Places as a part of The Rosenwald School Building Fund and Associated Buildings Multiple Property Submission on January 22, 2009.

See also
National Register of Historic Places listings in Montgomery County, Alabama
Properties on the Alabama Register of Landmarks and Heritage in Montgomery County, Alabama
Historical Marker Database

References

School buildings on the National Register of Historic Places in Alabama
School buildings completed in 1922
Defunct schools in Alabama
American Craftsman architecture in Alabama
National Register of Historic Places in Montgomery County, Alabama
Properties on the Alabama Register of Landmarks and Heritage
Rosenwald schools in Alabama
Historically segregated African-American schools in Alabama
1922 establishments in Alabama